This is the Only Level is a 2009 meta Flash game developed by John Cooney and published by Armor Games. The title of the game is a literal description of the game - the whole game takes place in a single level the player has to play over and over again, albeit with several game-changing variations as the game progresses. The game has received an (unofficial) port to PICO-8. Cooney also released two sequels to the game, This is the Only Level Too and This is the Only Level 3. The game was included on a list of "10 Flash Games That Pushed The Limits Of The Genre" in a 2021 ScreenRant listicle.

References

Browser games
Flash games
Indie video games
2009 video games
Single-player video games
Video games developed in the United States
Armor Games games